Boston State College was a public university located in Boston, Massachusetts, United States.

History
Boston State College's roots began with the Girls' High School, which was founded in 1852. In 1872, the Boston Normal School separated from Girls' High School and became an independent institution, although it still occupied the building alongside the high school and Girls' Latin School. The Normal School was renamed the Teachers College of the City of Boston in 1924. In 1952, it became a state college, the State Teachers College at Boston. The college was renamed the State College at Boston, also known as Boston State College, in 1960. Boston State College merged with University of Massachusetts Boston in 1982. After the merger, in the mid-1980s, its former main campus, located at 621 Huntington Avenue, was acquired by the Massachusetts College of Art, and serves as that institution's primary campus.

Notable alumni
 Jack Beatty – writer and radio commentator
 Bill Berglund – ice hockey player
 Edward G. Connolly – politician
Peter Petrigno – politician, teacher, and community organizer.
 Michael L. Coyne – lawyer
 Richard Curwin – professor
 Daniel Anthony Hart – prelate
 Mel King – politician, teacher, and community organizer
 Bruce Lehane – Cross country coach at Boston University
 Dan Rea – television and radio journalist
 Francis Roache –  Boston Police Commissioner from 1985 to 1993
 Edward F. Shea – federal judge
 Anna Tolman Smith  – educator, writer, editor
 Robert Travaglini – politician
 John Tsang – civil servant and Financial Secretary of Hong Kong
Gladys Wood – Boston Public Schools' first Black principal
Mike Gorman Boston Celtics play-by-play announcer

External links
 UMass Boston: Boston State College
 Boston State College collection, 1900-1982, University Archives and Special Collections, Joseph P. Healey Library, University of Massachusetts Boston
 Boston State College (and predecessors) yearbooks, 1917-1982
 Boston State College newspaper (Chalkdust), 1954-1971

 
Defunct universities and colleges in Massachusetts
Universities and colleges in Boston
Embedded educational institutions
Educational institutions established in 1872
Educational institutions disestablished in 1982
1872 establishments in Massachusetts
1982 disestablishments in Massachusetts